Orla O'Loughlin is a British theatre director currently the Vice Principal & Director of Drama at Guildhall School of Music & Drama

Education

Orla trained at the National Theatre and National Theatre Studio. She has a B.A (Hons) in Theatre and Performance from Warwick University, an M.A (Dist) in Advanced Theatre Practice from Central School of Speech and Drama and a PGCE in Drama from the University of Reading.

Career

She is currently the Vice Principal & Director of Drama at Guildhall School of Music & Drama having taken up the position, full time, in January 2019. Alongside this role, she also works as a Freelance Theatre Director.

Previously, she was the Artistic Director of the Traverse Theatre, Edinburgh (January 2012 – December 2018.) 
Prior to her time at the Traverse, Orla was Artistic Director of Pentabus Theatre and the International Associate at The Royal Court.

The Observer listed Orla as one of the top 50 Cultural leaders in the U.K and she was included in The List Hot 100 of Women in the Arts. She is a regular subject for print and digital media and has appeared on BBC Radio 4’s Woman’s Hour, The Today Programme and was the subject of the BBC Radio Documentary Stark Talk covering her life and work. Orla continues to deliver masterclasses and workshops across the world and has sat on a range of award panels including: James Tait Black Award for Drama, Windham Campbell and the Linbury Prize.

Directing credits

•	What Girls Are Made Of  (Traverse Theatre, Tramway, International Tour)

•	Mouthpiece (Traverse Theatre, Soho Theatre)

•	Locker Room Talk (Traverse Theatre, Latitude Festival, Abbey Theatre, Scottish Parliament & On Tour)

•	Meet Me at Dawn (Traverse Theatre)

•	Milk (Traverse Theatre)

•	Swallow (Traverse Theatre)

•	Spoiling (Traverse Theatre, Theatre Royal Stratford East)

•	Ciara (Traverse Theatre, Citizens Theatre)

•	Clean and A Respectable Widow takes to Vulgarity (Traverse Theatre, Oran Mor, Theatre 59E59, NYC)

•	The Artist Man and the Mother Woman (Traverse Theatre)

•	For Once (Hampstead Theatre, National Tour)

•	Origins (Pleasance, Theatre Severn, National Tour)

•	Relatively Speaking, Blithe Spirit, Black Comedy (Watermill Theatre)

•	Kebab (Dublin International Festival, Royal Court Theatre)

•	Small Talk: Big Picture (Royal Court Theatre, ICA, BBC World Service)

•	How Much is your Iron? (Young Vic)

•	The Hound of the Baskervilles (West Yorkshire Playhouse, National Tour and West End)

•	Shuffle (Merry Hill Shopping Centre)

•	Underland (Clearwell Caves)

•	A Dulditch Angel (National Tour)

•	The Fire Raisers (BAC)

Awards

Her work has won a range of Fringe Firsts, Herald Angels and Critics Awards for Theatre in Scotland and she is previous winner of the James Menzies Kitchin Directors Award and recipient of the Carlton Bursary at the Donmar Warehouse.

References 

British theatre managers and producers
Year of birth missing (living people)
Living people